Mario Seidel (born 19 January 1995) is a German footballer who plays as a goalkeeper for Kickers Offenbach.

Career

Kickers Offenbach
On 18 June 2019, Seidel joined Kickers Offenbach on a 1-year contract.

References

External links
 Profile at FuPa.net
 

1995 births
Living people
Footballers from Berlin
German footballers
Association football goalkeepers
FC Erzgebirge Aue players
1. FC Magdeburg players
Kickers Offenbach players
3. Liga players
2. Bundesliga players